Jorge Valdés Vázquez, better known as DJ Flow or Dímelo Flow, is a Panamanian DJ and producer based in the United States. After collaborating with many artists and producers in the Latin music industry like J Balvin, Justin Quiles, Dalex, and Feid, Dímelo Flow just released his debut album "Always Dream" with features from Ozuna, Nicky Jam, Arcangel, and Reik, to new up-and-coming artists in the industry like Beéle, paopao, and Thyago.

Early Beginnings and Making Connections 
Dímelo Flow began his career as a DJ at 15 years old. When he was 20 years old, he moved to Florida from Panama working for a radio station until he began to work consistently as a DJ for clubs in Tampa, Florida. While in Tampa, Dímelo Flow met Justin Quiles, a successful reggaeton singer-songwriter that was not well known at the time. Soon after meeting, the two began working together and Dímelo Flow began producing his songs. Justin Quiles also introduced him to more artists in the Latin music industry which led him to getting signed by RichMusic.

Always Dream 
After producing many hits for his label mates at Rich Music, including the popular album "The Academy," he has developed close bonds with both up-and-coming and well-known artists, who are confident in his work and did not hesitate to contribute to his debut album: Always Dream. Ozuna, Farruko, Zion & Lenox, Wisin, Nicky Jam, Jowell & Randy, Arcangel, Reik, and newcomers Mariah Angeliq, Beéle, paopao, and Thyago are among the other performers on the 28 track album.

Music Style 
Dímelo Flow's style is described as an electronic twist to reggaeton. He is also known for being able to adapt to the style of the musical artists he's worked and find a good middle ground for both his and their styles.

Discography

Studio Albums

Collaborative Albums/EPs

Production Discography

Charted Songs

References

External links 

 

1989 births
Living people
Panamanian musicians
Reggaeton record producers